The 2001–02 Busta Cup was the 36th edition of what is now the Regional Four Day Competition, the domestic first-class cricket competition for the countries of the West Indies Cricket Board (WICB). It was played from 25 January to 8 March 2002.

Eight teams contested the competition, which was played as a round-robin. The six regular teams of West Indian domestic cricket (Barbados, Guyana, Jamaica, the Leeward Islands, Trinidad and Tobago, and the Windward Islands) were joined by a development team (West Indies B) and an invited overseas team (Bangladesh A). Jamaica finished undefeated on the top of the table, claiming a sixth domestic first-class title. The Busta Cup was followed by a brief knockout competition called the Busta International Shield. It was played from 15 March to 7 April, featuring the top four teams from the Busta Cup, and was won by Guyana.

Points table

Key

 W – Outright win (12 points)
 L – Outright loss (0 points)
 LWF – Lost match, but won first innings (4 points)

 DWF – Drawn, but won first innings (6 points)
 DLF – Drawn, but lost first innings (3 points)
 Pts – Total points

Statistics

Most runs
The top five run-scorers are included in this table, listed by runs scored and then by batting average.

Most wickets

The top five wicket-takers are listed in this table, listed by wickets taken and then by bowling average.

See also
 2001–02 Red Stripe Bowl

References

2001–02 West Indian cricket season
2002 in West Indian cricket
Regional Four Day Competition seasons
Domestic cricket competitions in 2001–02